Herbert Rappaport (1908–1983), known in the Soviet Union as Gerbert Moritsevich Rappaport, was an Austrian-Soviet screenwriter and film director.

Rappaport was born in 1908 in Vienna, Austria-Hungary, to Jewish parents from Lemberg (now Lviv, Ukraine). From 1927 to 1929 he studied law at University of Vienna. Rappaport worked as screenwriter, music editor, and assistant director in Austria, Germany, and the United States from 1928 onward. During the early 1930s he worked as an assistant to Georg Wilhelm Pabst. In 1936 he was officially invited to the Soviet Union to internationalize the Soviet Cinema which he accepted and spent the following 40 years working as a filmmaker there.

Among Rappaport's best known films is an adaptation of Dmitri Shostakovich's Cheryomushki ("Cherry Town") (1963).

In 2008 the first workshow  was initiated outside Russia by the Austrian Filmmuseum and SYNEMA-Gesellschaft für Film und Medien, showing about half of his films.

Filmography
 Professor Mamlok (Профессор Мамлок) / Professor Mamlock (1938); with Adolf Minkin
 Gost (Гость) / A Guest (1939); with Adolf Minkin
 Muzykalnaya istoriya (Музыкальная история) / Musical Story (1940); with Aleksandr Ivanovsky
 Vozdushnyy izvozchik (Воздушный извозчик) / Taxi to Heaven (1943)
 Elu tsitadellis / Life in the Citadel (1947)
 Aleksandr Popov (Александр Попов) / Alexander Popov (1949); with Viktor Eisymont
 Valgus Koordis / Light in Koordi (1951)
 Mastera russkogo baleta (Мастера русского балета) / Stars of the Russian Ballet (1953)
 Andruse õnn / Andrus' Happiness (1955)
 Poddubenskiye chastushki (Поддубенские частушки) (1957)
 Vihmas ja päikeses / Rain or Shine (1960)
 Cheryomushki (Черемушки) / Cherry Town (1962)
 Dva bileta na dnevnoy seans (Два билета на дневной сеанс) / Two Tickets for a Daytime Picture Show (1967)
 Chyornye sukhari (Черные сухари) / Black Dried Crust (1972)
 Krug (Круг) / Circle (1972)
 Serzhant militsii (Сержант милиции) / Sergeant of Militia (1974)
 Menya eto ne kasaetsya (Меня это не касается) / It's Not My Business (1976)

References

External links 
 

1908 births
1983 deaths
Austrian emigrants to the Soviet Union
Austrian screenwriters
Austrian Jews
Film people from Vienna
Soviet film directors
Soviet screenwriters
Stalin Prize winners
Austrian male screenwriters